Perleberg station is a railway station in the municipality of Perleberg, located in the Prignitz district in Brandenburg, Germany.

References

Railway stations in Brandenburg
Buildings and structures in Prignitz